TUI Cruises is a cruise line based in Germany. It was formed in 2007 as a joint venture between the German tourism company TUI AG and the American cruise line operator Royal Caribbean Group, both of whom hold a 50% stake in the company. The company started operations in 2009 and competes with AIDA Cruises for the German market. It targets German-speaking customers who opt for a premium cruise experience. The onboard product, including food, entertainment and amenities, is custom-tailored for German tastes and German is the main language used onboard its ships.

In February 2020 TUI announced the purchase of Hapag-Lloyd Kreuzfahrten. The take over was completed in July 2020.

Fleet

Current fleet 
Due to lack of new-building capacity, TUI Cruises started by acquiring the cruise ship Celebrity Galaxy, which was built by Meyer Werft and was owned by another Royal Caribbean Group subsidiary, Celebrity Cruises. She left the Celebrity fleet on 16 March 2009. After acquiring Celebrity Galaxy, the ship headed to Lloyd Werft shipyards in Bremerhaven, Germany. She arrived on 27 March 2009, and received a €50 million, 38-day conversion to upgrade her facilities to suit a German-speaking market. After the conversion, she was re-christened on 15 May 2009 in Hamburg, Germany bearing her new name, Mein Schiff (My Ship). TUI planned to build two 2,500-passenger, 100,000-GT cruise ships in 2011 and 2012.

On May 27, 2010, it was announced that another Century-class ship, Celebrity Mercury, would become the latest addition to TUI's fleet, renamed Mein Schiff 2. Due to this Mein Schiff was immediately renamed Mein Schiff 1. Mein Schiff 2 entered service with TUI in February 2011 after its extensive refurbishment, with the addition of more verandas, an expanded fitness area and design elements which are also found on Mein Schiff 1.

TUI and STX Finland announced a contract on 27 September 2011 to build a 97,000-GT vessel named Mein Schiff 3, which was delivered in 2014. The ship has 1,250 staterooms, most of which have balconies, with a capacity of 2,500 passengers and a crew of 1,000. The ship includes several restaurants, a theatre, spa and nightclub. The contract included an option to build a second ship, dependent on the approval of TUI Cruises shareholders. It was announced on November 5, 2012 that TUI had taken up the second option for the sister ship to the Mein Schiff 3, to be named Mein Schiff 4. On April 22, 2014, Mein Schiff 3 entered service. In March 2015, Royal Caribbean International announced that they had agreed to sell  to TUI Cruises in the second quarter of 2016, and that TUI would lease the ship to Thomson Cruises to replace the Island Escape. In May 2015, TUI Group announced that as part of their modernization strategy,  and  would be transferred to Thomson Cruises over the next few years, as a result, 2 replacement ships neue Mein Schiff 1 and neue Mein Schiff 2 were ordered. On January 15, Mein Schiff 5 was launched. On April 28,  Mein Schiff 6's  was laid down.

Future fleet

Former ships

References

External links

 TUI Cruises official site 

Cruise lines
Royal Caribbean Group
TUI Group
2007 establishments in Germany
Companies based in Hamburg